Hotel Keturah is a historic hotel building located at McCormick in McCormick County, South Carolina.  It was built about 1910, and is a 2 1/2-story, brick building with a hipped roof in the Colonial Revival style.  The front façade features a one-story frame porch with Doric order Tuscan columns.

It was listed on the National Register of Historic Places in 1985.

References

Hotel buildings on the National Register of Historic Places in South Carolina
Colonial Revival architecture in South Carolina
Hotel buildings completed in 1910
Buildings and structures in McCormick County, South Carolina
National Register of Historic Places in McCormick County, South Carolina
1910 establishments in South Carolina